Aethalochroa affinis, commonly known as the Pakistani stick mantis, is a species of praying mantis in the genus Aethalochroa native to Pakistan.

See also
List of mantis genera and species
Stick mantis

References

Aethalochroa
Insects of Asia
Insects described in 1889
Taxa named by James Wood-Mason